Kwasengen, also known as Hanga Hundi, is one of the Ndu languages of Sepik River region of northern Papua New Guinea.

Further reading
Wendel, Thomas D. 1993. A Preliminary Grammar of Hanga Hundi. Masters thesis. University of Texas at Arlington.

References

Languages of East Sepik Province
Ndu languages